Jan Rynveld Carew (24 September 1920 – 6 December 2012) was a Guyana-born novelist, playwright, poet and educator, who lived at various times in The Netherlands, Mexico, England, France, Spain, Ghana, Jamaica, Canada and the United States.

Carew's works, diverse in form and multifaceted, make Jan Carew an important intellectual of the Caribbean world. His poetry and first two novels, Black Midas and The Wild Coast (both published in 1958 by Secker & Warburg in London), were significant landmarks of West Indian literature then attempting to cope with its colonial past and assert its wish for autonomy.

Carew worked with the late President Cheddi Jagan in the fight for Guianese independence. He also played an important part in the Black movement gaining strength in England and North America, publishing reviews and newspapers, producing programmes and plays for radio and television. His scholarly research drove him to question traditional historiographies and the prevailing historical models of the conquest of America. The way he reframed Christopher Columbus as an historical character outside his mythical hagiography became a necessary path in his mind to build anew the Caribbean world on sounder foundations.

Biography

Childhood in British Guiana
Jan Rynveld Carew was born on 24 September 1920 at Agricola, a coastal village also called Rome, in British Guiana, the South American colony of the British Empire that would become the present-day Guyana. He was the middle child and only son of Ethel Robertson and Alan Carew. From 1924 to 1926, the Carews lived in the United States but Jan and his elder sister Cicely, returned to Guyana after the kidnapping of his younger sister Sheila, in New York in 1926. The child would be recovered and reunited with her family in 1927. Carew's father lived on several occasions in the United States and Canada, working for a while with the Canadian Pacific Railway, and thus crossing the American continent from Halifax to Vancouver. His memories would fuel the imagination of the young Carew.

From 1926 to 1938, he was educated in Guyana, first attending the Agricola Wesleyan School, then the Catholic elementary school and then Berbice High School, a Canadian Scottish Presbyterian School, in New Amsterdam. He passed his Senior Cambridge Examination in 1938.

After leaving education in 1939, he became a part-time teacher at Berbice High School for Girls, but was called up to the British Army as the Second World War broke out in Europe. He served in the Coast Artillery Regiment until 1943. From 1943 to 1944, he was a customs officer in Georgetown. At that time, he published his first text in the Christmas Annual and was working a lot on his painting and drawing. From 1944 to 1945, he worked at the Price Controls Office in Port-of-Spain, Trinidad.

Carew felt himself to be part of the Caribbean world that for him included "the island archipelago, the countries of the Caribbean littoral and Guyana, Surinam, and Cayenne." He found the paradoxical unity of the Caribbean way of life in the "successive waves of cultural alienation" that shaped the Caribbean frame of mind from "a mosaic of cultural fragments - Amerindian, African, European, Asian."

The university years
At the age of 25, he left Guyana for the United States, where he studied science at Howard University and Western Reserve University (1945–1948), the predecessor of Case Western Reserve University but left without graduating. Later, Carew attended Charles University in Prague (1948–1950) and the Sorbonne in Paris.

Exile and later years
In what he described as his "endless journeyings", he lived at different times in the Netherlands, Mexico, England, France, Spain, Ghana, Canada and the United States. In 1951, while in the Netherlands, he was editor of De Kim (multilingual poetry magazine in Amsterdam). In England, he acted alongside Laurence Olivier and edited the Kensington Post in 1953. He also worked as a broadcaster and writer with the BBC and lectured in race relations at London University. He was the first editor of the black-oriented publication Magnet News, launched in London in February 1965.

He always maintained his Caribbean links, and in 1962 served as director of culture in British Guiana under the Jagan administration. According to York University Professor Emeritus Dr. Frank Birbalsingh, "He was a strong supporter of the late Dr. Cheddi Jagan and the People's Progressive Party. He was quite fearless when it came to politics."

Between 1962 and 1966 Carew lived in Jamaica with his then wife Sylvia Wynter, subsequently moving to Canada for some years before settling in the USA. During this period he served as editor of African Review in 1965, and in 1969 became publisher of Cotopax (a Third World literary magazine). Carew taught at Princeton, Rutgers, Illinois Wesleyan, Hampshire College, Northwestern and Lincoln Universities and was Emeritus Professor of African American Studies at Northwestern University.

Jan Carew died at his home in Louisville, Kentucky, USA, at the age of 92, survived by his widow Dr Joy Gleason, his daughters Lisa St Aubin de Terán and Shantoba Eliza Carew, and his son, David Christopher Carew.

Carew's memoir Potaro Dreams: My Youth in Guyana was posthumously published in 2014. Envisaged as a first volume, covering the period from birth in 1920 to 1939 when Carew was drawn into the Second World War, the book was described by the author as "the prism" through which he would approach life.

Activism

The black movement and the problem of culture
Carew was a pioneer in the field of Pan-African Studies. Some of the noted figures to whom Carew has been connected are W. E. B. Du Bois, Paul Robeson, Langston Hughes, Malcolm X, Kwame Nkrumah, Shirley Graham Du Bois, Maurice Bishop, Cheikh Anta Diop, Edward Scobie, John Henrik Clarke, Tsegaye Medhin Gabre, Sterling D. Plumpp and Ivan Van Sertima.

The invasion of Grenada and the redefinition of colonial history
In his book Grenada: The Hour Will Strike Again (1985), published two years after the American invasion of Grenada, "Carew unearthed and revealed sources of independence in the country itself. [The book] went back to and beyond the struggles of the rebellious African captives, but to the epic resistance of the island's indigenous population."

The environmental issue
As noted by Eusi Kwayana, Carew "was an environmentalist long before it become fashionable" and made a recommendation to the government of Guyana for an international involvement for a million acres of forestland in Guyana, which inspired an Act on the Guyanese statute book to provide for approximately 360,000 hectares of tropical rainforest for the purposes of research "to make available to Guyana and the International Community systems, methods, and techniques for the sustainable  management and utilisation of the multiple resources of the Tropical forest and the conservation of biological diversity and for matters incidental thereto."

Selected literary works

Carew wrote novels, short stories, plays, memoirs and other non-fiction, as well as children's stories and books, but he remains best known for his first novel, Black Midas (1958). He was a contributor of reviews, articles, short stories and essays to many periodicals, including John O'London's Weekly, Time and Tide, Art News and Review, New England Review and Bread Loaf Quarterly, The New York Times, Saturday Review, New Statesman, African Review, The Listener, Journal of African Civilizations, Black Press Review, New Deliberations, Journal of the Association of Caribbean Studies, Black American Literature Forum, Pacific Quarterly, and Race & Class. His many works include:

Novels / novellas 

 Black Midas (London: Secker & Warburg, 1958; Peepal Tree Press, 2009); published as A Touch of Midas in US  (New York: Coward, 1958)
The Wild Coast (London: Secker & Warburg, 1958; Peepal Tree Press, 2009)
The Last Barbarian (London: Secker & Warburg, 1961)
Moscow is Not My Mecca (London: Secker & Warburg, 1964); published as Green Winter (Stein & Day, 1965)
The Riverman – novella (Trenton, NJ: Africa World Press, 1987)
 The Sisters – novella (Trenton, NJ: Africa World Press, 1987)
 The Sisters and Manco's Stories (Oxford: Macmillan Caribbean Writers, 2002)
The Guyanese Wanderer: Stories (Louisville, KY: Sarabande Books, 2007)

Poetry 

 Streets of Eternity (privately printed, 1952)
 Sea Drums in My Blood (Trinidad: New Voices,1981)
 Return to Streets of Eternity (Smokestack Books, 2015)

Juvenile / young adult fiction 
 Sons of the Flying Wing (Toronto: McClelland & Stewart, 1970)
 The Third Gift, illus. Leo and Diane Dillon (New York: Little Brown & Co., 1974)
 Children of the Sun, illus. Leo and Diane Dillon (New York: Little Brown & Co., 1980)
 Stranger than Tomorrow: Three Stories of the Future (London: Longman, 1976)
 Save the Last Dance for Me, and Other Stories, (London: Longman, 1976)
 The Twins of Ilora (New York: Little, Brown 1977)
 The Lost Love, and Other Stories, Longman (London: Longman, 1978)
 The Man Who Came Back, Longman (London: Longman, 1979)
 The Cat People, Longman (London: Longman, 1979)
 Dark Night, Deep Water (London: Longman, 1981)
 Dead Man's Creek: Two Stories (London: Longman, 1981)
 House of Fear: Two Stories (London: Longman, 1981)
 Don't Go Near the Water (London: Longman, 1982)
 Time Loop (London: Hutchinson Education, 1983)
 Death Comes to the Circus (London: Hutchinson Education, 1983)
 Computer Killer (London: Hutchinson Education, 1985)

Non-fiction 
Cry Black Power (Toronto: McClelland & Stewart, 1970)
Rope the Sun (Third Press, 1973)
(Editor) Out of Time, illus. Howard Phillips (Cardiff: Adult Basic Education Centre, 1975)
Indian and African Presence in the Americas (Atlanta: Georgia State University, 1984)
Grenada: The Hour Will Strike Again (Prague: International Organization of Journalists Press, 1985)
Fulcrums of Change: Origins of Racism in the Americas and Other Essays (Trenton, NJ: Africa World Press, 1988)
Ghosts in Our Blood: With Malcolm X in Africa, England and the Caribbean (Chicago: Lawrence Hill Books, 1994)
Rape of Paradise: Columbus and the Birth of Racism in the Americas (Brooklyn: A & B Publishers, 1994; Seaburn Publishing, 2006)
Potaro Dreams: My Youth in Guyana (Hansib Publications, 2014)
Episodes in My Life: The Autobiography of Jan Carew — edited by Joy Gleason Carew (Peepal Tree Press, 2015)

Essays 

 "Being Black in Belorussia is Like Being from Mars" (The New York Times, 19 September 1971)
 "Look Bwana, in East Africa you carry a bicycle on the bus, eat crocodile tail and get to know the people who married the wind"  (The New York Times, 24 October 1971)
 "The Caribbean writer and exile" (Journal of Black Studies, Vol. 8, No. 4, 1978, pp. 453–475)
 "The fusion of African and Amerindian folk myths" (Caribbean Quarterly, Vol. 23,  No. 1, 1977, pp. 7–21 and Bim, Vol. 16,  No. 64, 1978, pp. 241–257)
 "Estevanico: The African Explorer" (Journal of African Civilizations, Vol. 3. No. 1, April 1981, pp. 86–99)
 "Columbus and the origins of racism in the Americas: part one" (Race & Class, April 1988, Vol. 29: pp. 1–19)
 "Columbus and the origins of racism in the Americas: part two" (Race & Class, April 1988, Vol. 30: pp. 33–57)
 "United We Stand! Joint Struggles of Native Americans and African Americans in the Columbian Era" (Monthly Review, Vol. 44, No. 3: July–August 1992)
 "Columbus: a harbinger of slavery and racism" (The New York Amsterdam News, 11 July 1992, pp. 2 & 29)
 "Moorish Culture-Bringers: Bearers of Enlightenment" (in Ivan Van Sertima, ed., Golden Age of the Moor, New Brunswick: Transaction Press, 1992, pp. 248–277)
 "Culture and Rebellion" (Race & Class: Special issue – Black America: the street and the campus, Vol. 35, No. 1, July – September 1993)
 "Jonestown revisited" (Eusi Kwayana, A New Look At Jonestown: Dimensions from a Guyanese Perspective, Carib House, 2016)
 "The Ivory trade: The cruelest trade of all, white gold"
 "The Synergen project"
 "The Amaranth project"

Radio plays 
 1957: The River Man, BBC
 1958: The Legend of Nameless Mountain, BBC
 1958: Anancy and Tiger, BBC
 1960: The University of Hunger (with Sylvia Wynter) BBC
 1968: Song of the Riverman, BBC Radio 3

Television plays 

 1961: The Big Pride (with Sylvia Wynter), ITV/Associated Television
 1961: The Day of the Fox, Associated Television (starring Sammy Davis Jr.)
 1963: Exile from the Sun, Associated Television (never performed)
 1963: The Baron of South Boulevard, Associated Television
 1963: No Gown for Peter, Associated Television
 1963: The Raiders, Associated Television
 1963: The Smugglers, Associated Television
 1963: A Roof of Stars, Associated Television
 1963: The Conversion of Tiho, Associated Television
 1969: Behind God's Back, Canadian Broadcasting Company

Stage plays 
 Black Midas – screenplay
 1962: Miracle in Lime Lane (adaptation of a play by Coventry Taylor) – produced in Spanish Town, Jamaica
 1966: The University of Hunger (three-act) – produced in Georgetown, Guyana, at Georgetown Theatre
 1967: Gentlemen Be Seated – produced in Belgrade, Yugoslavia
 1970: Black Horse, Pale Rider (two-act) – University of the West Indies, Extra-Mural Department
 1975: Behind God's Back – Carifesta, Volume 2
 1987: The Peace Play

Selected awards
Amongst the many awards that Carew received during his lifetime, of note are:

 1964: Daily Mirror Award for Best Play (for The Big Pride)
 1974: Illinois Arts Council award for fiction (for the short story "Ti-Zek")
 1974: American Institute of Graphic Arts Certificate of Excellence (for The Third Gift)
 1977: Casa de las Américas Prize for poetry,
 1979: Pushcart prize (for the essay "The Caribbean writer and exile")
 1985: The Walter Rodney Memorial Award from the Association of Caribbean Studies
 1985: National Film Institute Award (for screenplay of Black Midas)
 1990: The Hansib Publication Award
 1991: The Franz Fanon Freedom Award
 1998: The Paul Robeson Award (for "living a life of art and politics")
 2002: The Clark-Atlanta University Nkyinkyim Award
 2003: The Caribbean-Canadian Lifetime Creative Award from the Caribbean Canadian Literary Exposition
 2008: Independent Publisher Bronze Prize for Multicultural Fiction (for The Guyanese Wanderer)

Further reading
 Carew, Joy Gleason, and Hazel Waters (ed.), The Gentle Revolutionary: Essays in Honour of Jan Carew. Race & Class, vol. 43, n° 3, January 2002
 Jan Carew interviewed by Maureen Warner-Lewis, Prague, 1984, Journal of West Indian Literature, vol. 2, n° 1, December 1987, pp. 37–40

External links
 Jan Carew website
 Plays by Jan Carew
 Al Creigton, "Jan Carew: the gentle revolutionary", Arts on Sunday, Stabroek News, 5 May 2002.
 N. D. Williams, "Jan Carew: Rewind & Last Hurrah", 5 September 2007.
 David Austin, "The gentle revolutionary: Jan Carew at 90", Stabroek News, 27 September 2010.
 Joy Gleason Carew, "Black Midas in Moscow - Conversations with Jan Carew", SX Salon, Small Axe, 16 December 2011.
 Eusi Kwayana, "Remembering Jan Carew (September 1920 - December 2012", Stabroek News, 10 December 2012.
 Literary archival documents by Carew are held at the General Manuscripts Miscellaneous Collection, Princeton Library, Special Collections.

References

1920 births
20th-century dramatists and playwrights
20th-century Guyanese writers
20th-century novelists
2012 deaths
Academics of the University of London
Guyanese expatriates in Ghana
Guyanese expatriates in Mexico
Guyanese expatriates in Spain
Guyanese activists
Guyanese artists
Guyanese expatriates in Canada
Guyanese expatriates in France
Guyanese expatriates in Jamaica
Guyanese expatriates in the Netherlands
Guyanese expatriates in the United Kingdom
Guyanese expatriates in the United States
Guyanese novelists
Guyanese writers
Howard University alumni
Male non-fiction writers